Anthony K. Deku (13 June 1923 – 29 May 2015) was a politician and a member of the Council of State of Ghana. He served as a former Presidential Aide to  Ghana’s first President; Osagyefo Dr. Kwame Nkrumah, Commissioner of Police in Ghana and an Astute Politician and Statesman.

Career
Anthony Deku was a Deputy Commissioner of Police in the Criminals Investigations Department prior to the coup d'état of 24 February 1966 which led to the overthrow of Kwame Nkrumah. He was later promoted Commissioner of Police in the same department.

Politics
Deku was one of four police officers who were on the National Liberation Council. The others were J.W.K. Harlley, the Vice Chairman, B. A. Yakubu, Deputy Commissioner of Police and J.E.O. Nunoo, Commissioner of Police (Administration). The Head of the government was Lt. Gen. Ankrah. Deku is alleged to have been involved in the planning of the coup with Emmanuel Kotoka and J. W. K. Harlley.

In 2009, he became a member of the Council of State.

Other activities
Anthony Deku is the Managing Director Securicor Limited in Ghana.

Honours
He was awarded the Order of the Star of Ghana by the Kufuor government in 2006.

References

External links
Picture of Members of the National Liberation Council

1923 births
2015 deaths
Ghanaian police officers
Recipients of the Order of the Star of Ghana
Members of the Council of State (Ghana)